Nebetiunet (“Lady of Dendera”; a title of the goddess Hathor) was a princess of the Eighteenth Dynasty of Egypt, a daughter of Pharaoh Thutmose III and his Great Royal Wife Merytre-Hatshepsut.

She is one of six known children of Thutmose and Merytre; her siblings are Pharaoh Amenhotep II, Prince Menkheperre and princesses Meritamen, the second Meritamen and Iset. She is depicted together with her sisters and Menkheperre on a statue of their maternal grandmother Hui (now in the British Museum).

Sources

15th-century BC Egyptian women
Princesses of the Eighteenth Dynasty of Egypt
Children of Thutmose III